Yarhiv (lit. [He] will Enlarge) is a moshav in central Israel. Located near Jaljulia, Matan and Nirit, it falls under the jurisdiction of Drom HaSharon Regional Council.

History
The moshav was founded in 1949 by demobilised IDF soldiers. Its name is taken from Deuteronomy 12:20:
When the LORD thy God shall enlarge thy border, as He hath promised thee, and thou shalt say: 'I will eat flesh', because thy soul desireth to eat flesh; thou mayest eat flesh, after all the desire of thy soul.

References

Moshavim
Populated places established in 1949
Populated places in Central District (Israel)
1949 establishments in Israel